Lee Vertongen (born 22 January 1975 in Palmerston North, New Zealand) is a New Zealand racing cyclist. He has won three bronze medals in the team pursuit event at the Commonwealth Games. He won his third bronze medal riding with Greg Henderson, Hayden Roulston and Matthew Randall at the 2002 Commonwealth Games. He was educated at Russell Street School. He also competed in the men's team pursuit at the 2000 Summer Olympics.

References

External links
 

Cyclists at the 2004 Summer Olympics
Olympic cyclists of New Zealand
Commonwealth Games bronze medallists for New Zealand
Cyclists at the 1994 Commonwealth Games
Cyclists at the 1998 Commonwealth Games
Cyclists at the 2002 Commonwealth Games
New Zealand track cyclists
1975 births
Living people
Sportspeople from Palmerston North
Commonwealth Games medallists in cycling
New Zealand male cyclists
Cyclists at the 2000 Summer Olympics
20th-century New Zealand people
Medallists at the 1994 Commonwealth Games
Medallists at the 1998 Commonwealth Games
Medallists at the 2002 Commonwealth Games